Appleton City Hall is a historic municipal building in Appleton, Minnesota, United States.  It was built in 1895 as one of the few monumental 19th-century buildings in rural western Minnesota.  It initially housed Appleton's government offices, fire department, and jail on the ground floor and an auditorium on the upper floor.  The city hall was listed on the National Register of Historic Places in 1977 for having local significance in the themes of architecture and politics/government.  It was nominated for supposedly being an example of Richardsonian Romanesque architecture and for its long service as a local government and community center.  However other sources describe the building's style less specifically as Romanesque Revival, and its municipal services relocated to other facilities in 1976.

See also
 List of city and town halls in the United States
 National Register of Historic Places listings in Swift County, Minnesota

References

1895 establishments in Minnesota
Buildings and structures in Swift County, Minnesota
City and town halls on the National Register of Historic Places in Minnesota
Former seats of local government
Government buildings completed in 1895
National Register of Historic Places in Swift County, Minnesota
Romanesque Revival architecture in Minnesota